Tomas ( or ) is a Swedish and Lithuanian given name.

It may refer to:
 Tomas Antonelius (born 1973), Swedish footballer
 Tomas Baranauskas (born 1973), Lithuanian historian
 Tomas Behrend (born 1974), Brazilian/German tennis player
 Tomas Brolin (born 1969), Swedish football player
 Tomas Danilevičius (born 1978), Lithuanian football player
 Tomas Davulis (born 1975), Lithuanian labour law scholar
 Tomas Delininkaitis (born 1982), Lithuanian basketball player
 Tomas Gadeikis (born 1984), Lithuanian sprint canoer 
 Tomas Gustafson (born 1959), Swedish speed skater
 Tomas Haake (born 1971), Swedish drummer
 Tomas Holmström (born 1973), Swedish ice hockey player
 Tomas Intas (born 1981), Lithuanian javelin thrower
 Tomas Kančelskis (born 1975), Lithuanian football player
 Tomas Kaukėnas (born 1990), Lithuanian biathlete
 Tomas Kronståhl (born 1967), Swedish politician
 Tomas Ledin (born 1952), Swedish singer, songwriter, guitarist and producer
 Tomas Lindberg (born 1972), Swedish musician
 Tomas Masiulis (born 1975), Lithuanian basketball player
 Thomas "Tam" McGraw (1952–2007), Scottish fugitive
 Tomas Pačėsas (born 1971), Lithuanian basketball player
 Tomas Radzinevičius (born 1981), Lithuanian football player
 Tomas Ramelis (born 1971), Lithuanian football (soccer) forward
 Tomas Ražanauskas (born 1976), Lithuanian football player
 Tomas Scheckter (born 1980), South African racing driver
 Tomas Tamošauskas (born 1983), Lithuanian football player
 Tomas Vaitkus (born 1982), Lithuanian cyclist
 Tomas Walsh (born 1992), New Zealand shot putter
 Tomas Žiukas (born 1970), Lithuanian football player
 Tomas Žvirgždauskas (born 1975), Lithuanian football player

See also
 Snowsnaps, one of the main characters is named Tomas
 Tomas (Riftwar Cycle), fictional character in books by Raymond E. Feist

References

Swedish masculine given names
Lithuanian masculine given names